Dato' Abdul Ajib bin Ahmad (13 September 19473 February 2011) was a Malaysian politician. He served as the Chief Minister of Johor from 1982 and 1986 and was later a minister in the federal government of Mahathir Mohamad. He was a member of the United Malays National Organisation (UMNO).

An economics graduate, Ajib worked as an adviser to Musa Hitam before becoming Chief Minister of Johor in 1982. He served as Chief Minister until 1986, when he moved to federal politics, winning the seat of Mersing . He became a minister in the government of Mahathir Mohamad, but was dismissed in 1987 when Mahathir promptly purged the government cabinet of those who opposed him when they supported, among others, the then Deputy Prime Minister Tun Musa Hitam and Razaleigh Hamzah in the UMNO party presidency election.

Ahmad died of a heart attack at the age of 63 on 3 February 2011, leaving his wife Datin Ropeah Hassan, three sons and a daughter.

Honours
  :
 Knight Commander of the Order of the Crown of Johor (DPMJ) – Dato'
  Star of Sultan Ismail (BSI)
  :
  Grand Commander of the Exalted Order of Malacca (DGSM) – Datuk Seri (1984)

References

1947 births
2011 deaths
United Malays National Organisation politicians
Malaysian people of Malay descent
Malaysian Muslims
Government ministers of Malaysia
Members of the Dewan Rakyat
Members of the Johor State Legislative Assembly
Chief Ministers of Johor
Johor state executive councillors
Knights Commander of the Order of the Crown of Johor